Anna Łęcka (born 7 January 1980) is a Polish archer. She competed in the women's individual and team events at the 2000 Summer Olympics.

References

1980 births
Living people
Polish female archers
Olympic archers of Poland
Archers at the 2000 Summer Olympics
People from Radom County